Los legionarios ("The Legionnaires") is a 1958 Mexican comedy film directed by Agustín P. Delgado and produced by Miguel Zacarías. It stars María Antonieta Pons and Marco Antonio Campos and Gaspar Henaine as Viruta y Capulina.

Cast
María Antonieta Pons as Sheila
Marco Antonio Campos as Legionnaire Viruta (as Viruta)
Gaspar Henaine as Legionnaire Capulina (as Capulina)
Luis Lomelí as Prince Omar
Vicky Codina as Farida (as Bárbara Codina)
Donna Behar as Harem Singer
Pedro de Aguillón as The Sheik
Marc Lambert as Legionnaire Sergeant
Jorge Alzaga as Abdulah
Jenny Duina as Odalisque
Emma Grise as Odalisque (as Emma Grisse)

References

External links

Mexican comedy films
1950s Spanish-language films
Films with screenplays by Roberto Gómez Bolaños
1950s Mexican films